Dreamtime is a theme in Indigenous Australian mythology.

Dreamtime may also refer to:

Music 
 Dreamtime (musical), a 1992 Broadway musical
 Dreamtime (The Cult album), 1984
 Dreamtime (The Stranglers album),  1986
 Dreamtime (Tom Verlaine album), 1981
 "Dreamtime" (Tangerine Dream song), 1993
 "Dreamtime" (Daryl Hall song), 1986
 "Dreamtime", a song by Yes from Magnification
 "Dreamtime" (Record Label),  a subsidiary label of Peaceville Records

Other uses 
 Dreamtime (audio drama), a 2005 Doctor Who audio drama
 Dreamtime (book), a 1978 anthropological study of witchcraft written by Hans Peter Duerr
 Dreamtime Village, an intentional community in West Lima, Wisconsin, U.S.
 Dreamtime Festival, an annual music and arts festival near Paonia, Colorado, U.S.
 Dreamstime, a stock photography website
 Dreamtime at the 'G, an annual Australian rules football match between Australian Football League clubs Essendon and Richmond

See also 
 Dream (disambiguation)
 Dreaming (disambiguation)